1719 Jens is a background asteroid from the central region of the asteroid belt, approximately 19 kilometers in diameter. It was discovered on 17 February 1950, by German astronomer Karl Reinmuth at Heidelberg Observatory in southern Germany. It was named after a grandson of the discoverer.

Orbit and classification 

Jens orbits the Sun in the central main-belt at a distance of 2.1–3.2 AU once every 4 years and 4 months (1,581 days). Its orbit has an eccentricity of 0.22 and an inclination of 14° with respect to the ecliptic.

In 2010, Jens was passing in front of the Tadpole Nebula (see image obtained by WISE).

Physical characteristics

Lightcurves 

In September 2000, American astronomer Brian Warner obtained two rotational lightcurves, giving a rotation period of 5.867 and 5.87 hours with a brightness variation of 0.50 and 0.55 magnitude, respectively.

In February 2006, photometric observations by French amateur astronomer Laurent Bernasconi gave a concurring period of 5.873 hours with an amplitude of 0.55 magnitude. This well-defined period was further confirmed by a modeled light-curve using data from the Lowell Photometric Database, giving a period of 5.87016 hours.

Spectral type 

It is classified as S- and C-type asteroid by the LCDB and Pan-STARRS, respectively.

Diameter and albedo 

According to the surveys carried out by the Infrared Astronomical Satellite IRAS and NASA's Wide-field Infrared Survey Explorer with its subsequent NEOWISE mission, Jens measures between 18.93 and 21.61 kilometers in diameter and its surface has an albedo between 0.085 and 0.149. The Collaborative Asteroid Lightcurve Link derives an albedo of 0.1048 and calculates a diameter of 18.76 kilometers based on an absolute magnitude of 11.7.

Naming 

This minor planet was named by the discoverer for his grandson. Karl Reinmuth also named the consecutively numbered asteroid, 1720 Niels, after one of his grandsons. The official  was published by the Minor Planet Center on 20 February 1976.

References

External links 
 Lightcurve plot of 1719 Jens, Palmer Divide Observatory, B. D. Warner (2000)
 Asteroid Lightcurve Database (LCDB), query form (info )
 Dictionary of Minor Planet Names, Google books
 Asteroids and comets rotation curves, CdR – Observatoire de Genève, Raoul Behrend
 Discovery Circumstances: Numbered Minor Planets (1)-(5000) – Minor Planet Center
 
 

001719
Discoveries by Karl Wilhelm Reinmuth
Named minor planets
19500217